Costa Andricopoulos (born 30 March 1991) is an Australian born Footballer who currently plays for Hakoah Sydney City East FC.

References
http://www.goalweekly.com/index.php?option=com_k2&view=item&id=2881:costa-andricopoulos&Itemid=143
http://afootballstory.blogspot.com.au/2012/04/generation-next-costa-andricopulos.html

External links
 http://www.sportingpulse.com/team_info.cgi?action=PSTATS&pID=196066643&client=0-9353-135041-253802-18714962

1991 births
Living people
Australian people of Greek descent
Australian soccer players
Australian expatriate soccer players
APOEL FC players
Ethnikos Latsion FC players
Association football defenders